The Scarborough General Hospital (officially Scarborough Health Network, General Hospital) is a major hospital in the Scarborough district of Toronto, Ontario, Canada. Located northwest of the intersection of McCowan Road and Lawrence Avenue East, the hospital opened in 1956 as the first in the former township of Scarborough.

History
The Scarborough General Hospital was founded by the Sisters of Misericorde in 1956 as the first hospital in the borough of Scarborough. In 1998, The Salvation Army, who founded the Scarborough Grace Hospital (now known as Birchmount Hospital), took over administrative duties of the Scarborough General and formed a new hospital network known as The Scarborough Hospital as part of a proposal to the Health Services Restructuring Commission. Under the new administration, the hospital campus was officially known as The Scarborough Hospital, General Division, although the former name was still used by locals.

In 2009, the Scarborough General Hospital opened a  Emergency and Critical Care Centre in its new West Wing. The project, which more than doubled the size of the previous emergency department, features new infection control and isolation protocols as well as five care zones that are designed to provide the appropriate level of care for specific patients' acuities—Pediatric, Rapid Assessment, Critical Care, Acute Care and Ambulatory Care. The new wing is also home to a 22-bed Critical Care Centre that consolidates patients from the previous Intensive Care Unit, Coronary Care Unit and Acute Medical Unit. A Satellite Diagnostic Imaging department also opened in the West Wing, with the Greater Toronto Area's first Siemens YSIO DR-X-ray units that result in faster images and a more comfortable experience for both patients and technologists. The hospital is also the first in the world to run two key diagnostic imaging systems (Agfa HealthCare's IMPAX 6.3.1 and Cardiovascular 7.7,) on an integrated platform—a major benefit for cardiac patients who can now get faster, more accurate diagnoses and treatment.

On December 1, 2016, the campuses of The Scarborough Hospital (General and Birchmount) and the Centenary Hospital merged to form a new administrative network, the Scarborough Health Network. As of 2019, the hospital network plans to reduce the number of hospital sites from three to two by 2031. In one of three expansion options, the Scarborough General Hospital is considered to be shut down.

See also
List of hospitals in Toronto

References

Hospital buildings completed in 1956
Hospitals established in 1956
Hospitals in Toronto
Buildings and structures in Scarborough, Toronto
1956 establishments in Ontario